Weightlifting was part of the 2009 National Games of China held in Shandong. Men competed in eight and women in seven weight classes.

The competition program at the National Games mirrors that of the Olympic Games as only medals for the total achieved are awarded, but not for individual lifts in either the snatch or clean and jerk. Likewise an athlete failing to register a snatch result cannot advance to the clean and jerk.

Medal summary

Men

Women

Medal table

References 

2009 in weightlifting
2009 in Chinese sport
2009